Geoffrey Ambrose (born 26 July 1946) is a British former motorcycle speedway rider.

Born in Stoke-on-Trent, Ambrose began his career in 1967 with Wolverhampton Wolves, riding in two Division One matches. He stayed with Wolverhampton until the end of the 1971 season, also riding in Division Two for Crayford Highwaymen in 1968 and 1969. His best year was 1969, averaging over 10 points per match for Crayford and over 6 for Wolverhapton, also winning the Second Division Riders Championship. He represented a Young England side against Australasia and Czechoslovakia in 1969, and again in 1973, against Sweden.

In 1972 he moved on to Leicester Lions, and scored well until a series of knee injuries prompted his retirement from the sport. In 1973 he returned to racing with Crewe Kings in Division Two, also making four appearances for Leicester.

He retired early in the 1975 season to concentrate on his motorcycle dealership business. 

Ambrose was also a musician, and played in a band.

References

1946 births
Living people
British speedway riders
English motorcycle racers
Sportspeople from Stoke-on-Trent
Wolverhampton Wolves riders
Crayford Kestrels riders
Leicester Lions riders
Crewe Kings riders